Leon Van Loo (1841–1907) was a Belgian-born photographer and art promoter.

Born 12 August 1841, in Ghent, Belgium, he moved to Cincinnati, Ohio in 1858, when he opened a photography gallery.  After doing well in the cotton trade after the Civil War, he retired early in 1866.  He subsequently spent time travelling to Europe and collecting art, which he displayed in Cincinnati.

In 1875, he introduced a new kind of photography he called "ideal."  Photographs using this technique are printed on zinc oxide applied to blackened sheet-iron and present a pearly, transparent surface.

In 1890, he was a founding member of the Cincinnati Art Club and served as president from 1894 to 1896 and 1903–1904.

Van Loo died on 10 January 1907.

External links
 
 Leon Van Loo profile at Luminous Lint
 Cincinnati Art Club

1841 births
1907 deaths
Belgian photographers
American photographers
19th-century photographers
Photographic techniques
Artists from Cincinnati
People from Ghent
Burials at Spring Grove Cemetery